Olyokminsk Airport  is an airport serving the urban locality of Olyokminsk, Olyokminsky District, in the Sakha Republic of Russia.

Airlines and destinations

External links

References

Airports built in the Soviet Union
Airports in the Sakha Republic